Baby Calendar is a three-piece indie pop band from Miami, Florida. In 2006, Baby Calendar was signed to Happy Happy Birthday To Me Records based in Athens, Georgia and known for releasing mostly indie pop and twee-pop bands, working with bands such as Of Montreal, Casper & the Cookies, and Bunnygrunt, and hosting the annual Athens Popfest.

The band has scheduled and performed hundreds of tour dates all across the United States, including spots at Plan-It-X Fest (2005, 2006), the HHBTM Athens Popfest (2006), and the CMJ Music Marathon in New York City (2006). Festival appearances and tour dates are a regular staple for the band. Since 2007, Baby Calendar has reduced the number of live performances due to extensive outside projects and as of 2008, the band members have performed as Call it Radar and under Tom Gorrio's moniker.

Members 
Tom Gorrio - Vocals, Guitar, Piano, Bass, Drums
Jaquelinne Biver - Vocals, Bass guitar, Keyboard
Arik Dayan - Drums, Xylophone

Discography 
Your Move, Self Released, 2004
Fifteen Year Old Sneakers, Self Released, 2005
Gingerbread Dog, Happy Happy Birthday To Me Records, 2006
"Fishboy/Baby Calendar, Split 7" single" (as part of the 2007 Happy Happy Birthday To Me Singles Club) Happy Happy Birthday To Me Records, 2007
Happy Happy Birthday To Me Vol. 4 CD, contributed track: "Live Underwater", 2007

External links 
Baby Calendar bio at Happy Happy Birthday to Me Records
Happy Happy Birthday to Me Records
Live Baby Calendar Shows at Archive.org
HHBTM Records Announces CMJ Lineup
Baby Calendar on podbop blog
 Live show review at Space City Rock, Houston, TX
Baby Calendar plans a national self-booked tour, Sun Sentinel
Gingerbread Dog album review at Absolute Punk

Musical groups from Miami